Nikola Vulić; (Shkodër, Ottoman Empire, 27 November 1872 – Belgrade, Yugoslavia, 25 May 1945) was a Serbian historian, classical philologist, prominent archaeologist, doctor of philosophy and professor at the University of Belgrade.

Biography
Born in Scutari in 1872 during the period of Ottoman rule, he left for Serbia where he studied Latin, Old Church Slavonic, Ancient Greek, and ancient history. He graduated from the University of Belgrade in history. For his post-graduate studies he went to the University of Munich, where he received his doctorate. Upon his return to Belgrade, he was named professor at his alma mater. During World War I, Serbia's Minister of Education in-exile in Greece concluded that professors and teachers should be seconded from the army. Nikola Vulić was exempt from further serving in the army in 1917. In Clermont-Ferrand he taught Latin to both Serb and French students.

He is remembered as the translator of Aeneid by Virgil in 1907–1908.

References

 Translated and adapted from Serbian Wikipedia:Nikola Vulić

1872 births
1945 deaths
20th-century Serbian historians
Classical philologists
Serbian archaeologists
Academic staff of the University of Belgrade
Members of the Serbian Academy of Sciences and Arts
People from Shkodër
Yugoslav archaeologists
Serbian writers
Serbs in Albania